The Pittsburg–Clarksville Covered Bridge (also known as the Bacon Road Bridge) is a wooden Paddleford truss bridge with added arches over the Connecticut River located between Pittsburg and Clarksville, New Hampshire.  It was closed to traffic in 1981.  The bridge is the northernmost covered bridge crossing the Connecticut River.

History 
It was rehabilitated in 1974 at a cost of $6,700 which was shared by the towns of Pittsburg and Clarksville, and the state.

See also 
 List of crossings of the Connecticut River

References

External links 
 

Covered bridges in New Hampshire
Pittsburg, New Hampshire
Bridges over the Connecticut River
Bridges completed in 1876
Wooden bridges in New Hampshire
Tourist attractions in Coös County, New Hampshire
Bridges in Coös County, New Hampshire
Road bridges in New Hampshire
Long truss bridges in the United States
1876 establishments in New Hampshire